Olposel (also, Ol-po-sel) is a former Wintun settlement in Lake County, California. It was located on Cache Creek; its precise location is unknown.

References

Former settlements in Lake County, California
Former Native American populated places in California
Wintun villages